Niebuszewo-Bolinko is a municipal neighbourhood of the city of Szczecin, Poland, in Śródmieście (Centre) District, north of the Szczecin Old Town. As of January 2011, it had a population of 22,403.

References

See also 
 Niebuszewo

Niebuszewo-Bolinko